Of the Conduct of the Understanding is a text on clear and rational thought by John Locke, published in 1706, two years after the author's death, as part of Peter King's Posthumous Works of John Locke. It complements Locke's Some Thoughts Concerning Education, which explains how to educate children.

The text espouses the importance of rational self-examination and its virtues when combating mental illness. Moral purity and sanity were, according to Locke, inextricably linked to self-scrutiny and mental freedom.

See also
 George Mason Memorial, Washington, D.C., includes Of the Conduct of the Understanding as an element of the statue of a seated Mason.

References

External links
 
 John Locke, Of the Conduct of the Understanding, edited with General Introduction, Historical and Philosophical Notes and Critical Apparatus by Paul Schuurman
Books about education
Works by John Locke